Mountain Gateway Community College (MGCC, formerly Dabney S. Lancaster Community College) is a public community college in Clifton Forge, Virginia. It is part the Virginia Community College System.

Academics
MGCC offers a wide variety of credit programs, including those for transfer and selected occupational, technical and allied health fields.

Non-credit classes, summer camps for youth and special topics seminars are offered throughout the year. The division of Workforce Services and Community Education customizes education and training for the unique needs of current and prospective employers.

Location
The main campus is located in Clifton Forge, Virginia. MGCC also operates the Rockbridge Regional Center on Vista Links Drive in Buena Vista.

Renaming
In 2022, the college was renamed from Dabney S. Lancaster Community College to Mountain Gateway Community College after a review of names prompted by the Virginia State Board for Community Colleges. The review found that Lancaster supported segregation and even had ties to a white supremacy group.

References

External links 
 Official website

Virginia Community College System
Universities and colleges accredited by the Southern Association of Colleges and Schools
Education in Alleghany County, Virginia
Education in Rockbridge County, Virginia
1962 establishments in Virginia
Educational institutions established in 1962